Orthomegas sylvainae is a species of beetle in the family Cerambycidae. It is found in French Guiana and Venezuela.

References

Beetles described in 2011
Beetles of South America
Prioninae